Gengele or Kegengele is a creole based on Lega-Shabunda, Kusu and other languages. It is spoken in Kindu, DR Congo. Ethnologue lists it as a dialect of the Songoora language.

References

Bantu-based pidgins and creoles
Lega-Binja languages
Tetela languages
Languages of the Democratic Republic of the Congo